Christopher Simpson (c. 1602/06–1669) was an English musician and composer.

Christopher Simpson may also refer to:
Christopher Simpson (actor) (born 1975), Irish actor
Christopher Simpson (cricketer) (1890–?), Guyanese cricketer
Chris Patrick-Simpson (born 1979), Northern Irish actor
Chris Simpson (cardiologist) (born 1967), Canadian cardiologist
Chris Simpson (cricketer) (born 1982), Australian cricketer 
Chris Simpson (squash player) (born 1987), British squash player
Chris Simpson (musician), musician with the band Magna Carta

See also
Christine Simpson (born 1964), Canadian television presenter